W. Alfred Debo (November 15, 1877 – March 7, 1960) was an American football player and coach, lawyer, and politician. He played at the halfback position on the first football team for Detroit College—now known as the University of Detroit Mercy—in 1896.  He was also the school's head football coach for the 1903 and 1904 seasons, compiling a 7–6 record. He later served as an Internal Revenue Service investigator, Democratic Party state chairman, Michigan Parole Board commissioner, and member of the Detroit Board of Assessors. He died in 1960 at age 82.

Head coaching record

College

References

External links
 

1877 births
1960 deaths
19th-century players of American football
American football halfbacks
Detroit Titans football coaches
Detroit Titans football players
Internal Revenue Service people
Michigan Democrats